Nitin Khanna (born March 18, 1971) is an Indian-born entrepreneur settled in Portland, Oregon, United States. He is the chairman of MergerTech, an international mergers and acquisitions advisory firm. He is also the co-founder of Saber Corp., which is now acquired by EDS.

Early life and education
Khanna completed his early education at the Lawrence School, Sanawar, and obtained his bachelor's and master's in Industrial Engineering from Purdue University, Portland.

Career 
Khanna has been the CEO of MergerTech since its inception in 2009. He co-founded a tech organization named Saber Corp in 1998, which was a provider of state government solutions in US. He helped it grow to 1200 employees and over $120MM in revenue by 2007, when he sold it to EDS for $460MM. Khanna then took over the leadership of EDS' government business operation. 

Khanna has also worked with Oracle Corporation. In 2015, he started Cura Cannabis Solutions. He has invested $5 million in iSOS Inc., a productivity enhancement solutions software company. Khanna is a board member of Vendscreen, Freewire Broadband, TiE Oregon (non-profit) and the Classic Wines Auction (non-profit).

Acquisitions 
As the CEO of MergerTech, Khanna has led numerous mergers and acquisitions deals, including the following:
 Acquisition of ArcTouch by Grey
 Acquisition of Serene Corporation by AST Corporation
 Acquisition of GlobeSherpa by RideScout
 Strategic partnership of Media Labs with MDC Partners
 Acquisition of Springbrook by Accela
 Acquisition of AppThwack by Amazon Web Services
 Acquisition of Serus by E2open
 Acquisition of Mutual Mobile by WPP
 Acquisition of Simple by BBVA
 Acquisition of HPM Works by Cancom

Awards 
 Portland's Top 40 under 40 civic and entrepreneurial leaders in 2002

Allegations
After being accused of raping a stylist of his own wedding the day before the event, Khanna stepped down as CEO of Select cannabis oils, following news that he had reached a civil settlement with his accuser.

References 

Businesspeople from Chandigarh
Living people
1975 births
Businesspeople from Portland, Oregon
American chief executives
Purdue University College of Engineering alumni